The Formosa Air Battle, 12–16 October 1944, was a series of large-scale aerial engagements between carrier air groups of the United States Navy Fast Carrier Task Force (TF38) and Japanese land-based air forces of the Imperial Japanese Navy (IJN) and Imperial Japanese Army (IJA). The battle consisted of American air raids against Japanese military installations on Formosa (Taiwan) during the day and Japanese air attacks at night against American ships. Japanese losses exceeded 300 planes destroyed in the air, while American losses amounted to fewer than 100 aircraft destroyed and two cruisers damaged. This outcome effectively deprived the Japanese Navy's Combined Fleet of air cover for future operations, which proved decisive during the Battle of Leyte Gulf later in October.

Background
Japanese strategic plans for a decisive battle with the U.S. fleet were already established by September 1944. Anticipating the various options open to American landing forces, the Japanese operational order, code named Sho ("victory"), provided four scenarios to counter an invasion anywhere between the Philippines and the Kuriles. The plan was problematic for morale, however, because it broke with IJN tradition by assigning overriding importance to sinking U.S. supply vessels rather than U.S. warships. As a result, the Commander-in-Chief of the Combined Fleet Admiral Soemu Toyoda flew out to the front in early October to rally the troops behind Sho.

By 10 October Toyoda's tour of the front was complete. He intended to depart from Formosa for Japan that same day but was forced to change his plans when Vice Admiral Marc Mitscher's Fast Carrier Task Force suddenly appeared to the north, launching strikes against the Ryukyu Islands. Toyoda could not risk a return trip home through a concentrated enemy carrier force that now embarked more than 1,000 aircraft, especially not after previous Combined Fleet commanders had been lost during aerial engagements. As a result, he was grounded far from Combined Fleet headquarters at a decisive moment. Out of position and with inadequate lines of communication, the response to such overwhelming enemy air power was left to Toyoda's Chief of Staff, Vice Admiral Ryūnosuke Kusaka.

Kusaka correctly saw these strikes as a precursor to U.S. troop landings, in part due to Imperial Navy intelligence collected over the previous week. Because he was still unsure exactly where enemy forces would land, he chose to execute the air component of Sho-1 or Sho-2the planned defense of the Philippines or Formosa, respectivelyon the morning of 10October. Sho was a complex plan involving multiple naval surface forces sortieing from bases as far away as Singapore and Japan. It would take these warships time to maneuver into position for a concerted attack. Rather than waiting for the arrival of the fleet for a combination of sea and air power, Kusaka ordered the air forces reserved for Sho to engage the enemy at once. He reinforced this order by implementing Sho-2 in full on the morning of 12October.

Many aircraft were available for Sho but were widely dispersed. On 10October Vice Admiral Shigeru Fukudome's Sixth Base Air Force consisted of approximately 740 planes spread out from Formosa to Kyushu; Vice Admiral Kimpei Teraoka's Fifth Base Air Force and Lieutenant General Kyoji Tominaga's Fourth Air Army of the Imperial Japanese Army Air Service (IJAAS) in the Philippines together had around 440 aircraft. Over the course of the next four days an additional 690 or so planes arrived from Japan and China.

Although this represented a huge number of available aircraft, the Imperial Japanese Navy Air Service (IJNAS) was still recovering from losses suffered at the Battle of the Philippine Sea in June. While units were largely reconstituted in terms of quantity by this time, pilot quality was in clear decline. Moreover, though the overall number of planes committed to battle by 12October dwarfed any force that Japan had previously fielded in the air, the U.S. Navy's Fast Carrier Force was capable of committing a much larger, significantly better-trained force.

Order of battle
 
 Imperial Japanese Navy Air Service: 1,225 fighters/bombers.
 1st Air Fleet: based in Manila, Philippines
 2nd Air Fleet: based in Takao, Taiwan
 3rd Air Fleet: formerly carrier based, moved to land under command of 2nd Air Fleet
 
 Imperial Japanese Army Air Service: 200 fighters/bombers
 4th Air Army: based in Manila, Philippines

 
 Third Fleet
 Task Force 38 (TF 38): 17 aircraft carriers (including 8 light carriers), 6 battleships, 4 heavy cruisers, 11 light cruisers, 57 destroyers
 Task Group 38.1 (TG 38.1): USS Cowpens, USS Hornet, USS Monterey, USS Wasp
 Task Group 38.2 (TG 38.2): USS Bunker Hill, USS Cabot (detached), USS Hancock, USS Independence, USS Intrepid
 Task Group 38.3 (TG 38.3): USS Essex, USS Langley, USS Lexington, USS Princeton
 Task Group 38.4 (TG 38.4): USS Belleau Wood, USS Franklin, USS San Jacinto

Battle

Radar-equipped Japanese reconnaissance aircraft sighted various task groups of the Third Fleet throughout the day and night of 11October, giving area commanders on Formosa and in the Philippines early warning. Knowing that dawn strikes on 12October were imminent, ground forces were placed on alert and aircraft were readied for early morning intercept.

Combat experience of U.S. carrier air groups during the battle depended to a considerable degree upon disposition of their task group and assigned strike targets. On the morning of 12October, the four task groups of the Fast Carrier Task Force were strung out roughly from northwest to southeast. Task Group 38.2, as the northernmost group, was assigned the northern third of Formosa. Task Group 38.3 was next in line and assigned the central portion of the island. Finally, Task Groups 38.1 and 38.4 were jointly assigned southern Formosa.

12 October 

All four task groups completed launch of predawn fighter sweeps by around 06:00 hours. Because the Japanese were on alert,  Grumman F6F Hellcat fighters from all four groups were intercepted by enemy aircraft and moderate to intense anti-aircraft fire was universally reported. Air-to-air engagements were fiercest over northern and central Formosa, where aircraft from Rear Admiral Gerald F. Bogan's TG38.2 and Rear Admiral Frederick C. Sherman's TG38.3 operated. Sherman's  and  claimed almost 50 enemy aircraft shot down between them. Intrepid and Bunker Hill claimed over 50 Japanese aircraft destroyed, making the combined claims for the two groups around 100. The Japanese lost 17 of their 50 operational Formosa-based fighters, according to survivor Kazuo Odachi

American carrier air groups had suffered minimal personnel losses with nine U.S. aircraft shot down with three pilots subsequently recovered by nearby ships or submarines. These lopsided results were in part due to a lack of experience among Japanese pilots. IJAAS fighters stationed to the north of the Philippines were still in training. The bulk of enemy fighter aircraft reported by U.S. aviators were Japanese Army types, primarily the Nakajima Ki-44 (Allied reporting name "Tojo"), Kawasaki Ki-61 ("Tony") and Nakajima Ki-43 ("Oscar") models. Even though there were some experienced Japanese naval aviators operating at this time, IJNAS Mitsubishi A6M Zero fighter units reconstituted after the Battle of the Philippine Sea were still learning to work together and did not execute the kind of section or division flying that yielded tactical advantage.

Though the day's remaining carrier strikes by Hellcat fighters, Curtiss SB2C Helldiver dive bombers, and Grumman TBF Avenger torpedo bombers did significant damage to military installations on Formosa, they failed to completely neutralize Japanese air power based on the island. The Japanese response was well suppressed, however, and the only effective counterattack to develop against TF38 came from Japan itself. An elite air attack unit trained for all-weather and night flying called the T Kōgeki Butai (T攻撃部隊), meaning T Attack Force (the "T" being short for taifū (台風), or "typhoon"), moved south to execute Japan's first large-scale radar assisted nighttime aerial torpedo attack. The results were lackluster. U.S. Navy ships made smoke for cover and engaged in radical maneuvering to keep enemies astern as Japanese aircraft dropped flares to illuminate their targets.

13 October 
On 13 October the weather was more uncooperative than on the previous day. Even though a wider array of targets was assigned to the task groups, from the Pescadores to northern Luzon and Formosa, far fewer enemies were encountered in the air. Results of the day's strike operations were hard to ascertain due to the overcast. Pilots' reports from these two days of strikes helped uncover a larger network of air bases on Formosa than previously anticipated. This knowledge, combined with radio intercepts and the dusk strikes fended off the previous evening, led Commander Task Force 38 Mitscher to cancel any strikes scheduled to take off after 14:00 hours. Instead, the task groups prepared to defend against another night assault.

Elements of the T Attack Force returned as expected to carry out twilight strikes against U.S. warships. This time, TGs38.1 and 38.4 found themselves under attack. Japanese formations were spotted via radar at 16:40 and intercepted by Combat Air Patrol (CAP) planes from TG38.4's  an hour later.

By 18:12, just before sunset, another formation of T Attack Force pilots was closing to within striking range of the task groups. Six more planes were shot down in the vicinity of TG38.4 in the span of twenty minutes. A subsequent group of six Mitsubishi G4M "Betty" bombers which had penetrated the picket and evaded the CAP made determined attacks on the carriers of TG38.4, putting four torpedoes in the water before all six were shot down by shipboard anti-aircraft guns. One of the Bettys attempted to crash into Franklin on its way down but glanced off the flight deck and slid over the starboard edge of the ship into the water.

TG 38.1 was not as lucky. Ten Yokosuka P1Y "Frances" bombers made contact with the group at 18:23 after eluding early radar detection by flying low over the water. Though visual contact was made and shipboard anti-aircraft fire destroyed six planes, one Frances pressed home a determined torpedo attack on the carriers. Both engine rooms flooded and damage was done to the rudder. As a result, Canberra had to be taken in tow as part of a new task group, TG30.3, composed of ships detached from the carrier groups. Around 22:00  began towing the crippled cruiser to the southeast.

14 October 
The task groups were forced to stay within enemy air range longer than anticipated due to Canberra situation. Early morning fighter sweeps were launched to suppress air power on Luzon and Formosa while the newly formed task group attempted to escort Canberra to safety. Some air groups encountered Japanese planes in the strike zones, but no major air-to-air combat developed. Throughout the afternoon, enemy aircraft flew to the perimeter of the task groups to relay sighting reports.

Another long night at general quarters was anticipated by CTF 38. This intelligence was proved correct in short order. TGs38.1, 38.2, and 38.3 all suffered mass enemy air attacks between roughly 15:00–18:30 hours.

TG 38.2 was the first group attacked. A formation of 25 Yokosuka D4Y "Judy" dive bombers, using cloud cover to evade detection, was intercepted by the group's combat air patrol. Only a few Japanese planes made it past the American fighters. The surviving bombers were able to put two bombs in the vicinity of the Hancock, and one hit the forward port side gun tub without detonating on impact. No serious damage was inflicted by this attack.

At around 17:00 a large formation of enemies showed up on radar headed towards TG38.3. As before, a great many of these were shot down by combat air patrol. The surviving enemy planes flew down to the water level to evade further radar detection. These planestorpedo bombers and fighterssuccessfully ambushed the formation just minutes later. Evasive maneuvers, squall weather, and poor fighter cover on the part of the Japanese helped TG38.3 escape without suffering any significant damage.

Task Group 38.1 had been designated as cover for the retiring Canberra group. At 16:15  joined TG38.1 to replace Wichita, which had been positioned to port off Wasp bow before its assignment as tow boat. A large bogey appeared after sunset at 1831. Anti-aircraft batteries of the group's picket ships downed ten planes as they attempted to close on the carriers, but there were many more that made it to the center of the group. At least two enemy aircraft put torpedoes into the water in the vicinity of the Houston. The ship turned hard to starboard in an attempt to avoid the first torpedo wake that was seen. Though a second torpedo missed the ship to port, the first struck the cruiser amidships between the keel and armor belt. Flooding in the engine rooms and other interior spaces caused the ship to take on a 16°list. Many of the ship's crew had gone over the side of the wallowing vessel into the water. An order to abandon ship was almost given, but it was decided that  would tow the damaged cruiser back east.

Though attacks against TG 38.1 continued for hours after the Houston was hit, no further successes were scored by Japanese raiders.

15 October 
Initially, operations orders called for the task groups to refuel on this date. Given the torpedoing of Houston and Canberra, however, only TGs38.2 and 38.3 departed for refueling. TG38.4 was reassigned strikes on Luzon to keep attacking planes at bay while TG38.1 continued to function as escort for the group of damaged ships now nicknamed "Crippled Division1". Faced with the decision to either scuttle or protect the damaged cruisers, advisers to Admiral William Halsey Jr., the commander of the U.S. 3rd Fleet, convinced him to turn a bad situation into an opportunity. Unofficially dubbed "Bait Division", the slow-moving ships and their escorts were used as a lure to draw out the Japanese fleet. Urgent radio transmissions were broadcast on open channels in the hopes of enemy interception. It appeared based on sighting reports that the plan might work: in the morning and evening, cruiser and battleship forces were reported heading south from Japan and southeast from Formosa.

Meanwhile, enemy air attacks did not slack off despite severe losses suffered by the Japanese over the preceding days. Rather than waiting for nighttime raids, Japanese attack formations, escorted by A6M Zero fighters, conducted strikes on TGs38.1 and 38.4 from dawn to dusk. Combat air patrol over TG38.4 had to be augmented with additional fighters to intercept incoming Japanese aircraft. Approximately two dozen Japanese attack and fighter planes were shot down between 10:45–10:56 hours by a combination of CAP fighters and ships' guns. Fighters from  accounted for many more planes destroyed throughout the afternoon hours. Though Franklin took a glancing bomb hit during these battles, the damage proved superficial. TG38.4 planes did battle with the enemy over land as well. Air Group 13 (CAG-13) aboard Franklin encountered a large group of enemies at Nielson Field during the morning strikes against Luzon. They claimed at least 20 enemy planes for a loss of just one Hellcat fighter.

Once again, TG 38.1 was subject to the most concerted Japanese attacks. No offensive strikes were launched by the group's aircraft. Instead, CAP strength was bolstered as much as possible. Fighting Squadron 14 (VF-14) aboard  claimed 30 enemy planes shot down by day's end, and other carrier fighter groups in the task group downed over a dozen more. Some close bomb hits were recorded by the carriers, but no real damage was done to any U.S. warship during these attacks.

16 October 

Long-range searches were conducted in the morning and afternoon by task force aircraft. It was hoped that a Japanese surface fleet would be heading towards the broadcast location of Bait Division. Unfortunately, by the evening it was clear that enemy reconnaissance aircraft had taken stock of remaining U.S. fleet strength. No surface engagement developed from Halsey's "Lure of the Streamlined Bait".

Though enemy ships did not materialize, Japanese air attacks continued in force throughout the morning and into the afternoon. The largest strike, consisting of 75 Japanese attack and fighter planes, arrived around 13:30 hours. One twin engine plane fought through the CAP and ships' anti-aircraft batteries, surviving just long enough to put a torpedo in the water before the plane itself crashed into the sea.

The torpedo struck the after portion of the starboard side of the Houston, blowing 20 men overboard and spreading gasoline fires in the waters around the cruiser. Initially unsure whether the ship would hold together, the captain ordered the evacuation of 300 crew members while the ship's condition was ascertained. In the end it was determined she would stay afloat. Towing continued as before, slowly moving the task group towards the Naval Base Ulithi.

Aftermath 
Surviving Japanese pilots returned with tales of a stunning victory. It was reported that practically the whole U.S. Third Fleet had been sunk and that the American carrier force was left in shambles. Though some members of the IJN command were initially skeptical of such reports, this narrative was carried forward by members of the cabinet until it reached Emperor Hirohito. He congratulated the Navy and Army for their success. Newspapers in particular trumpeted these claims, repeating that the U.S. task force was broken and in retreat. Even those unconvinced members of the IJN, up to and including Toyoda, believed some kind of victory had been achieved off Formosa.

Actually, the Formosa Air Battle represented a rout of Japanese air forces and a turning point for future naval operations. Upon realizing the scale of the Japanese defeat suffered on 12 October alone, Vice Admiral Fukudome lamented, "Our fighters were nothing but so many eggs thrown at the stone wall of the indomitable enemy formation."

In response to the American strikes on Formosa beginning 12 October, newly formed carrier units like the Japanese 634th Naval Air Group (NAG) were detached from their ships in the IJN's Fourth Carrier Division. Posted to the land-based 2nd Air Fleet, the 634th NAG experienced rapid attrition throughout the remainder of the month. By January 1945 this group had no personnel capable of maintaining flight operations. At the same time, older carrier units like the 653rd Naval Air Group, which had just finished rebuilding after losses suffered during the First Battle of the Philippine Sea, were detached and similarly integrated into the 2nd Air Fleet. Over the course of the Formosa Air Battle alone the 653rd NAG lost almost half of its available aircraft.

Between the aforementioned carrier air group losses, which deprived Vice Admiral Jisaburō Ozawa's ships of their pilots, and losses of experienced land-based attack units like the TAttack Force, there remained no real prospect of providing air cover over the Japanese fleet for the coming Battle of Leyte Gulf. Both historians of the battle and IJN commanders have acknowledged this factor as the primary reason for the Sho plan's failure. H.P. Willmott writes: "In large measure, the Japanese defeat in the Philippines had assumed substance...prior to the landing operations of 17 and 20October. This was the case because of the nature and extent of the victory won by American carrier air groups in the course of their operations after 10October."  Toyoda, when posed the question "What would you say was the primary cause for the lack of success in that operation?" responded, "Our weakness in air, and...the fact that our pilots under Admiral Ozawa were not sufficiently trained."

The Formosa Air Battle also proved a turning point for Japanese military tactics. Organized kamikaze attacks had been proposed after the First Battle of the Philippine Sea but were rejected by Imperial Japanese Navy leaders through September 1944. Only in the immediate wake of the Formosa Air Battle, when Vice Admiral Takijirō Ōnishi replaced Vice Admiral Kimpei Teraoka as leader of the IJN's 1st Air Fleet, were units specifically deployed with the intent to crash-dive enemy vessels.

Footnotes

Notes

References

Secondary Sources

Primary Sources

External links

 
 
 
 

Philippine Sea
Pacific Ocean theatre of World War II
Imperial Japanese Navy Air Service
United States naval aviation
Naval aviation operations and battles
1944 in Japan
October 1944 events